Tobias Pollap (born 23 June 1986) is a German Paralympic swimmer who competes in international elite competitions. He is a three-time World medalist and an eight-time European medalist. He has also competed at the 2012 and 2016 Summer Paralympics.

References

External links
 
 

1986 births
Living people
German male freestyle swimmers
German male medley swimmers
German male butterfly swimmers
Paralympic swimmers of Germany
S7-classified Paralympic swimmers
Swimmers at the 2012 Summer Paralympics
Swimmers at the 2016 Summer Paralympics
Medalists at the World Para Swimming Championships
Medalists at the World Para Swimming European Championships
People from Hattingen
Sportspeople from Arnsberg (region)